Villarbasse massacre took place on November 20, 1945, in Villarbasse — about 20 km from Turin — where four men from Sicily (Pietro Lala, Giovanni D'Ignoti, Giovanni Puleo, and Francesco La Barbera) killed ten people: the men were sentenced to death, for the last application of capital punishment in Italy.

Background 
In November 1945, just after the end of World War II, Pietro Lala (aged 20) quit his job in a farm — known as "cascina Simonetto" — pretending an inheritance he was given by his family in Sicily. During the night between November 20 and 21, helped by his accomplices, entered into the farm to carry out a robbery: the group clubbed ten people and threw them, still alive, down a well. After committing the robbery, they also stole clothes, food and  Liras each.

The victims' bodies were found days later, leading to investigations in which D'Ignoti, Puleo and La Barbera were caught; Lala came back to Sicily where — despite the alias of Francesco Saporito — he was killed on April 11, 1946, by the Mafia. On July 5, 1946, the Corte d'Assise sentenced to death the remaining guilty individuals.

Victims 
 Massimo Gianoli
 Teresa Delfino
 Antonio Ferrero
 Anna Varetto
 Renato Morra
 Fiorina Maffiotto
 Rosa Martinoli
 Marcello Gastaldi
 Gregorio Doleatto
 Domenico Rosso

Execution and aftermath 
The last execution in Italy for common crimes took place on March 4, 1947, at 7:45 AM when D'Ignoti, Puleo and La Barbera were shot to death in a rifle range by a 36-man firing squad. Enrico De Nicola refused to commute their sentences to life in prison.

Italian Parliament eventually abolished capital punishment in early 1948.

See also 
 Capital punishment in Italy

References

Sources 
 

1945 in Italy
Mass murder in 1945
Massacres in Italy
Massacres in 1945
November 1945 events in Europe

People convicted of murder by Italy
20th-century executions by Italy
People executed by Italy by firing squad
Executed mass murderers
20th-century mass murder in Italy
1945 murders in Italy